Mashhad Urban Railway (Qâtar-e Shiheri Mishhed, the literal translation of the name from Persian) is a rapid transit urban rail line in Mashhad, Iran. It is the second rapid transit system in Iran. The project has been known by a number of terms, including "light rail" or "light metro" and "urban rail" or "metro", though the system's full-grade separation from traffic and five-minute headway fully qualify it as a rapid transit or "metro" system. Mashhad Urban Railway operates its line 1 from 6 to 22:00 daily. Construction of the second line which is a metro line is ongoing.

Construction of line 1 began in 1999, with the inauguration of Line 1 taking place on 24 April 2011.

Network

Line 1

The , 22 station Line 1 was the first line to be built; it opened for service on 24 April 2011. Line 1 runs between Nakhrisi in the east and Vakilabad in the southwest, with travel time of 41 minutes. Approximately half the route is in tunnels; the rest is at ground level.

Line 1 Expansion
Expansion of Line 1 added  of underground railroads and 2 stations (Reyhane and HashemiNezhadAirport), connecting Mashhad International Airport to the Mashhad Urban Railway.
Also making Mashhad the first city in Iran to have a Metro system connected to an Airport.

Line 2
From Feb 2017 limited operation of the first phase of line 2 began. Mashhad urban railway system is connected to the inter-urban railway system in Rahahan Station. On 20 March 2018  pilot operation of the first interchange station in Mashhad railway system was started. On 7 May 2018 
Iranian President Hassan Rouhani took part in the inauguration ceremony of the first Mashhad Urban Railway interchange station "Shariati" which connects line 1 and 2.

Line 3

Line 3's construction has begun, with TBMs doing the excavation. Currently more than  excavation has been finished.

Further Development
Another additional line is planned. Line 4 with  length has been approved, and the studies for line 4 are reaching completion and final approval level. Tunnel Excavation of Line 4 will begin in Summer 2021.

Rolling stock
A fleet of 60 low-floor LRVs was ordered from Chinese Changchun Railway Vehicles for line 1. These mark the first time that light rail vehicles have been exported to a customer outside China.

A fleet of 100 metro trains has been ordered to CNR. 85 of them will be assembled in Iran by TWM. Currently, 70 of them are delivered and in-service condition.

Network Map

References

External links

Mashad Urban Railway Corp(MURCO)

Mashad Urban Railway Operation Company(MUROC)

 
Standard gauge railways in Iran
Transportation in Razavi Khorasan Province
Underground rapid transit systems in Iran